The Very Best of Kim Wilde' is the name of:

The Very Best of Kim Wilde (1984 album)
The Very Best of Kim Wilde (2001 album)